Ratman is a 1988 Italian horror film.

Ratman, Rat-Man or Rat Man can also refer to the following:

 Rat-Man (comics), an Italian comic book series by Leonardo Ortolani, and its title character
 Ratman (manga), a Japanese manga by Sekihiko Inui, and its title character
 Rat Man, a nickname given by Sigmund Freud to one of his patients
 "Ratty" Erwins, also known as "The Rat Man", a character in Stephen King's The Stand
 Ratman, a character in the animated series Dexter's Laboratory from the 1996 episode "The Justice Friends: Ratman"